Terminal Freeze is the fourth solo novel by Lincoln Child. The novel was released on February 24, 2009 by Random House. It is the second novel in the Jeremy Logan series.

Plot
The events take place in Alaska, north of the Arctic Circle. A decommissioned military base located near the fictional Mount Fear, the Mount Fear Remote Sensing Installation, is being used by a research team from Northern Massachusetts University to study the effects of global warming on a receding glacier. The team consists of five scientists from the University - Evan Marshall, a paleoecologist; Gerard Sully, a climatologist and the team leader; Wright Faraday, an evolutionary biologist; Ang Chen, a graduate student; and Penny Barbour, a computer scientist - along with the skeleton crew of four soldiers - Corporal Marcelin, Privates First Class Tad Phillips and Donovan Fluke, and the leader, Sergeant Paul Gonzalez.

The expedition discovers a monstrous ancient animal, presumed to be a preserved example of Smilodon populator, frozen in solid ice inside a lava tube made into an ice cave. The expedition's corporate sponsors, Terra Prime and its parent corporation Blackpool Entertainment, sense huge publicity and decide to have the beast cut from the ice, thawed, and revealed live on television. A massive entourage is sent to the base to begin production of the documentary, and the new crew includes Kari Ekberg, the field producer; Emilio Conti, the eccentric director (along with his assistant Hulce); Allan Fortnum, the director of photography; Ken Toussaint, the assistant director of photography; Wolff, the network liaison and channel representative; George Creel, the production foreman; and Ashleigh Davis, the spoiled host and star of the show (along with her assistant Brianna). The group is later joined by the truck driver Carradine, who brings Davis' luxurious trailer to the site, and a man who hitched a ride with Carradine, named Dr. Jeremy Logan, a private investigator and Yale professor of medieval history.

Meanwhile, local Tunit people, led by their chief Usuguk, try to warn the scientists that they do not understand what they have found. Specific warnings are that the entire mountain it was found in is a place of evil, the creature exists only for the sole purpose of killing, and that the Tunit do not believe it is dead. In addition, after a reexamination of the creature by Marshall, Faraday, and Barbour, it is revealed that the creature is not a Smilodon at all, but a new, unknown animal entirely, which may be up to 16 feet in length. However, Conti and Wolff are determined to move forward with the production, up until the creature suddenly vanishes from the vault it is being stored in. Although they initially believe it to be stolen, analysis of the hole in the vault floor by Faraday reveals that the incisions in the wood were made from the inside, and appear to be made by something more natural than a tool. Meanwhile, Logan reveals to Marshall that he is investigating the base itself after uncovering recently declassified government documents, detailing an incident at the base in 1958 that resulted in the deaths of 7 of the 8 scientists there. The incident, however, was forgotten when the officer reporting it, Colonel H.N. Rose, died in a plane crash with the full, detailed report.

When a production assistant named Josh Peters, Davis, and Fluke are all suddenly and brutally killed, along with Toussaint and Brianna being wounded, Gonzalez decides that the base has to be evacuated immediately. Carradine offers to transport everyone in his semi's trailer, and although Wolff initially objects, Gonzalez overrides him and agrees. Everyone boards the trailer and flees, leaving behind only the three remaining soldiers, Marshall, Logan, Ekberg, Sully, Conti, Wolff, Faraday, and Creel. After Logan investigates the abandoned quarters of the base's previous science team, he discovers a small journal left behind and hidden in a crawlspace by one of the former occupants, which, among other things, says that the Tunit have the answer to whatever it was that killed the team. Marshall decides to take the Sno-Cat and travel to the Tunit village, only to find that all of the Tunit have fled for the shoreline, leaving behind only the elderly shaman Usuguk. After Marshall's pleas for help and information about the monster, Usuguk reveals that he was the sole survivor of the crew of '58, and agrees to go back to the base with Marshall. Once they return, Usuguk explains the full story, and how the crew of the base discovered a similar creature similarly encased in ice, cut it out, and brought it back to the base. Usuguk calls it the kurrshuq (the "Fang of the Gods" and the "Devourer of Souls"), a local legend among the Tunit people for generations, and shocks everyone by explaining that the creature, upon thawing out and coming alive, was actually quiet friendly and playful. However, only after one scientist attempted to study its hunting habits by playing recordings of animal screams, did the creature suddenly turn violent and kill all except Usuguk. He then reveals one final, chilling detail: The kurrshuq that killed the team in 1958, before it also suddenly died and its body vanished, was no bigger than an Arctic fox; far smaller than this creature.

Meanwhile, the three soldiers and Creel (who volunteered to stay behind due to his hunting and military experience) all begin searching the base for the creature. Once they finally encounter it, it kills Creel and Marcelin while Gonzalez and Phillips return to the life sciences lab where the others are hiding. With Faraday's research of the blood found inside the vault, they realize that the creature has extremely advanced white blood cells that rapidly heal all wounds, and also contain the same compounds as PCP, thus giving the creature enormous and enduring strength. Marshall then speculates, after comparing all of the victims and the unusually distinct shape of the creature's ears, that the kurrshuq has extremely sensitive, sonar-like hearing, like a bat. He claims that, as Usuguk described and Toussaint himself raved about after being attacked, the creature likes to play with people rather than deliberately kill them, as none of its victims were actually eaten like a usual carnivore. Thus, the reason that all were killed except for Toussaint was because they screamed upon seeing the creature, and it killed them in order to stop the noise, just as the original kurrshuq did in 1958. Using this information, Marshall and Sully begin to construct a machine out of sonar technology to emit loud sounds that might be enough to ward off the creature. When Ekberg radios in for help after the monster kills Conti and Wolff (as the three had left on their own in a final attempt to film the creature), Marshall leaves to bring her back, and both return just as the monster appears. Sully tries several different frequencies of sound on the creature, with the final kind - the sine waves - causing the creature noticeable pain. However, the creature kills Sully and briefly stops the machine. Marshall, realizing that it was finally working, starts dragging the machine into a large echo chamber in order to amplify the sounds even greater. Marshall, Logan, and Usuguk lure the creature in, and Marshall turns up the sine waves even louder, causing the creature to collapse and writhe in agony before its head explodes.

In the epilogue, as the remaining crew members - Marshall, Logan, Ekberg, Faraday, Gonzalez, and Phillips - are being evacuated, the scientists are still baffled by the nature of the creature, as its corpse had suddenly disappeared after it supposedly died. After Usuguk leaves, Marshall speculates that perhaps the theory Usuguk had been insisting all along was true; that the creature was a creation of the spirits that rule this land according to Tunit culture, and that both the new kurrshuq and the older one had left the physical world for the spirit world, as Usuguk claimed they did. Logan cryptically mentions how he once lost a pet dachshund while on a family trip, implying that he believes the creature was left behind by extraterrestrial visitors. A budding relationship between Marshall and Ekberg is hinted at, and Logan bids them farewell, saying that he's gotten a call from his private investigation office about another interesting case.

Additional information
The setting and story of the book is very similar to the novella Who Goes There?, featuring an arctic setting where a group of scientists uncover and thaw out a mysterious creature in the ice, which then breaks free and runs amuck.
Tunit was the name assigned to the Dorset people in Greenland by the early Thule proto-Inuit. The last Dorset survivors died in 1902 and no Dorset People ever lived in Alaska, being resident in eastern Canada and Greenland.
The novel makes a brief reference to the very first novel by Child and his collaborator Douglas Preston, Relic.

See also

 Ice XV
 Dorset culture
 Saqqaq culture
 Qilakitsoq

References

External links
Random House: Terminal Freeze

Novels set in Alaska
Eco-thriller novels
Novels by Lincoln Child
American science fiction novels
American thriller novels

2009 American novels